Nardini is an Italian surname. Notable people with the surname include:

 Antonio Nardini (born 1922), Italian historian and author
 Daniela Nardini (born 1968), Scottish actress
 Erika Nardini, founder and CEO of Barstool Sports, sports and pop culture blog
 Girolamo Nardini (c. 1460–1538), Italian painter of a late-Gothic and early Renaissance styles
 Guido Nardini (1881–1928), Italian aviator
 , Italian actress
 Nicolò Nardini (1678–1697), Italian Roman Catholic prelate who served as Bishop of Acquapendente
 Paul Joseph Nardini (1821–1862), German diocesan priest, founder of the religious congregation of the Poor Franciscan Sisters of the Holy Family
 Pietro Nardini (1722–1793), Italian composer and violinist
 Riccardo Nardini (born 1983), Italian footballer
 Sadie Nardini, American creator of Core Strength Vinyasa Yoga, a modern style of Hatha Yoga
 Stefano Nardini (died 1484), Italian Roman Catholic bishop and cardinal
 Tom Nardini (born 1945), American actor
 Tommaso Nardini (1658–1718), Italian priest and painter of the Baroque period
 Gustavo Nardini (born 1982), Brazilian creative director nowadays working in Europe

Italian-language surnames